Sky Islands is a jazz album by Ramsey Lewis, released in October 1993 on GRP Records. The album rose to No. 6 on the Billboard Top Jazz Albums chart.

Track listing

Personnel
 Ramsey Lewis – piano, background vocals
 Art Porter Jr. – alto saxophone
 Michael Logan – keyboards, background vocals
 Henry Johnson – guitar
 Chuck Webb – bass guitar, double bass
 Steve Cobb – drums, percussion, vocals
 Tony Carpenter – percussion, background vocals
 Eve Cornelious – lead vocals, "Tonight" and "Love Will Find A Way"
 Sheila Fuller – background vocals
 Carl Griffin – background vocals
 Robert Lewis – background vocals
 Mark Ruffin – background vocals
 Brenda Stewart – background vocals
 Morris Stewart – background vocals

Production
 Ramsey Lewis - Producer
 Frayne Lewis - Producer
 Carl Griffin - Producer
 Larry Rosen - Executive Producer
 Michael Logan - Associate Producer
 Rich Breen - Engineer, Mixing
 Sharon Franklin - Production Coordination
 Ted Jensen - Mastering
 Michael Landy - Post Production
 Sonny Mediana - Production Director
 Dennis Tousana - Assistant Engineer
 Maurice White - Producer

Charts

References

1993 albums
Albums produced by Maurice White
Ramsey Lewis albums
GRP Records albums

es:Islas del Cielo